Elphas Mukonoweshuro (c. 1953 – 5 August 2011) was a Zimbabwean political scientist and politician. A former University of Zimbabwe dean of social studies, he was the Movement for Democratic Change-Tsvangirai member of parliament for Gutu South in Masvingo Province.

On 10 February 2009, Morgan Tsvangirai designated Mukonoweshuro for the position of Minister of Public Service as part of the Zimbabwe Government of National Unity of 2009.

Mukonoweshuro died after a short illness in South Africa on 5 August 2011.

References

Year of birth missing
2011 deaths
Academic staff of the University of Zimbabwe
People from Harare
Government ministers of Zimbabwe